Pinukpuk, officially the Municipality of Pinukpuk  is a 1st class municipality in the province of Kalinga, Philippines. According to the 2020 census, it has a population of 34,275 people.

It is in the northern part of Kalinga province, which is a gateway to Tuao, Cagayan, and Conner, Apayao.

History
Pinukpuk, while being a municipal district, reduced its territories when Governor-General Leonard Wood issued executive orders transferring barrios of Mabaca, Buaya, and Canna to Balbalan (EO No. 16; issued on June 23, 1926 and effective July 1), as well as Barrio Puguin and sitios of Umnay, Bauban, and Daga to Conner in the sub-province of Apayao (EO No. 55; issued on March 19, 1927 and effective April 1).

Geography

Barangays
Pinukpuk is politically subdivided into 23 barangays. These barangays are headed by elected officials: Barangay Captain, Barangay Council, whose members are called Barangay Councilors. All are elected every three years.

 Aciga
 Allaguia
 Ammacian
 Apatan
 Asibanglan
 Ba-ay
 Ballayangon
 Bayao
 Camalog (formerly Camcamalog)
 Cawagayan (formerly Cagao-ayan) [The first Barangay From Tabuk in the Western part of the Chico River.]
 Dugpa
 Katabbogan
 Limos
 Magaogao
 Malagnat
 Mapaco
 Pakawit
 Pinococ
 Pinukpuk Junction -Center
 Socbot [First Barangay from Tabuk in the Eastern part of Chico River]
 Taga (Poblacion)
 Taggay
 Wagud

Climate

Demographics

Economy

Government
Pinukpuk, belonging to the lone congressional district of the province of Kalinga, is governed by a mayor designated as its local chief executive and by a municipal council as its legislative body in accordance with the Local Government Code. The mayor, vice mayor, and the councilors are elected directly by the people through an election which is being held every three years.

Elected officials

Education

List of National High Schools
As of July, 2021, Pinukpuk has 10 Secondary Schools.
Allaguia National High School
Asibanglan National High School
Cal-owan Agricultural Vocational National High School
Camalog National High School
Cawagayan National High School
Limos National High School
Malagnat National High School
Pinukpuk Vocational School
Socbot National High School
St. Theresita High School - Pinukpuk

References

External links
 [ Philippine Standard Geographic Code]
Local Governance Performance Management System

Municipalities of Kalinga (province)
Populated places on the Rio Chico de Cagayan